Aghal is a town in the Federally Administered Tribal Areas of Pakistan. It is located at 33°43'9N 70°47'34E with an altitude of 2086 metres (6847 feet).

References

Populated places in Khyber Pakhtunkhwa